Bedadi is a small village in the Mansehra District of the Khyber Pakhtunkhwa, Pakistan. It is located at 34°27'0N 73°16'0E with an altitude of 970 metres (3185 feet), the village was damaged by the 2005 Kashmir earthquake.

References

Populated places in Mansehra District
Mansehra District